Arash Usmanee (born March 8, 1982) is an Afghan-Canadian professional boxer. He has been ranked as high as 3rd by the WBA (World Boxing Association) and 10th by the IBF. Usmanee has been a featured fighter on ESPN's Friday Night Fights when he fought Rances Barthelemy in a bout featuring two undefeated fighters.

Background 
Arash Usmanee was born in Afghanistan. In 1994, his family immigrated to Canada after his father was killed by a missile.

Arash became a boxer at the age of 17. He almost qualified for the Canadian boxing team for the 2008 Summer Olympics but just missed qualifying.

Arash decided to turn pro at the end of 2008 and had his first professional fight in January 2009 against Richar Cuaran.

To become more noticed in the boxing community, he left Alberta in order to establish himself in Montreal.

Professional career
In January 2013, Usmanee lost on points in a controversial manner to the Cuban fighter Rances Barthelemy on Friday Night Fights. According to many observers, Usmanee had won the fight clearly.

In August 2013, Usmanee received his first shot at a world title in a fight against IBF Junior Lightweight titleholder Argenis Mendez. The fight ended in a draw with one judge scoring the fight for Usmanee (115-113) and the two others scoring it a draw (114-114). The draw meant Mendez retains the title. In contrast to Usmanee's last fight, observers felt the boxer was lucky to come out with a draw.

Professional record 

| style="text-align:center;" colspan="8"|21 Wins (10 knockouts, 11 decisions), 2 Losses (0 knockouts, 2 decisions), 1 Draw''
|-  style="text-align:center; background:#e3e3e3;"
|  style="border-style:none none solid solid; "|Res.
|  style="border-style:none none solid solid; "|Record
|  style="border-style:none none solid solid; "|Opponent
|  style="border-style:none none solid solid; "|Type
|  style="border-style:none none solid solid; "|Rd., Time
|  style="border-style:none none solid solid; "|Date
|  style="border-style:none none solid solid; "|Location
|  style="border-style:none none solid solid; "|Notes
|- align=center
|Win
|21–2–1
|align=left| Juan Ruiz
|
|
|
|align=left|
|align=left|
|- align=center
|Loss
|20–2–1
|align=left| Raymundo Beltrán
|
|
|
|align=left|
|align=left|
|-align=center
|style="background: #B0C4DE"|Draw
|20–1–1
|align=left| Argenis Mendez
|
|
|
|align=left|
|align=left|
|- align=center
|Loss
|20–1              
|align=left| Rances Barthelemy  
|
|
|
|align=left|
|align=left|
|- align=center
|Win
|20–0
|align=left| Alan Paredes
|
|
|
|align=left|
|align=left|
|- align=center
|Win
|19–0
|align=left| Christian Faccio
|
|   
|
|align=left|
|align=left|
|- align=center
|Win
|18–0
|align=left| Chris Howard
|
|
|
|align=left|
|align=left|
|- align=center
|Win
|17–0
|align=left| Innocent Anyanwu
|
|
|
|align=left|
|align=left|
|- align=center
|Win
|16–0
|align=left| Antonio Joao Bento
|
|
|
|align=left|
|align=left|
|- align=center
|Win
|15–0
|align=left| Laszlo Robert Balogh
|
|
|
|align=left|
|align=left|
|- align=center
|Win
|14–0
|align=left| Sergio Javier Escobar
|
|
|
|align=left|
|align=left|
|- align=center
|Win
|13–0
|align=left| Alejandro Barrera
|
|
|
|align=left|
|align=left|
|- align=center
|Win
|12–0
|align=left| Aldo Valtierra
|
|
|
|align=left|
|align=left|
|- align=center
|Win
|11–0
|align=left| Isaac Bejarano
|
|
|
|align=left|
|align=left|
|- align=center
|Win
|10–0
|align=left| Pedro Navarrete
|
|
|
|align=left|
|align=left|
|- align=center
|Win
|9–0
|align=left| Anthony Flores
|
|
|
|align=left|
|align=left|
|- align=center
|Win
|8–0
|align=left| Genaro Garcia
|
|
|
|align=left|
|align=left|
|- align=center
|Win
|7–0
|align=left| Carlos Martinez
|
|
|
|align=left|
|align=left|
|- align=center
|Win
|6–0
|align=left| Hugo Pacheco
|
|
|
|align=left|
|align=left|
|- align=center
|Win
|5–0
|align=left| Jorge Ruiz
|
|
|
|align=left|
|align=left|
|- align=center
|Win
|4–0
|align=left| Willshaun Boxley
|
|
|
|align=left|
|align=left|
|- align=center
|Win
|3–0
|align=left| Edwin Perez
|
|
|
|align=left|
|align=left|
|- align=center
|Win
|2–0
|align=left| John Hoffman
|
|
|
|align=left|
|align=left|
|- align=center
|Win
|1–0
|align=left| Richar Cuaran
|
|
|
|align=left|
|align=left|
|- align=center

References

External links 
 

1982 births
Living people
Afghan male boxers
Canadian male boxers
Super-featherweight boxers
Lightweight boxers
Afghan emigrants to Canada